"The Phalanx Covenant" was a crossover storyline that ran through Marvel Comics' X-Men family of books in September and October 1994. One of its unique aspects was that the X-Men themselves only played a minor role in the story.

Plot

The X-Men are attacked by mutant-hating humans who have used the alien Warlock's techno-organic Phalanx virus to turn into techno-organic beings themselves. With these powers, the Phalanx are able to change their shape and assimilate organic matter. The Phalanx are also a hive mind and they are programmed to destroy all mutants.

The Phalanx Covenant was told in three separate storylines:
Generation Next: With the X-Men gone, Banshee, Emma Frost, Jubilee and Sabretooth have to save the next generation of mutants from the Phalanx agents led by Harvest. This storyline also planted the seeds for Marvel's next mutant title, Generation X.
Life Signs: X-Factor, Excalibur and X-Force discover that the Phalanx are losing their hive-mind programming and are becoming more and more independent and alien. The rogue Phalanx Douglock takes Forge, Wolfsbane and Cannonball on a mission to prevent the Phalanx Shinar from contacting the alien Phalanx.
Final Sanction: Cable, Wolverine, Cyclops, and Phoenix reunite to rescue the X-Men by infiltrating the main base of the Phalanx.

Tie-in issues
Generation Next
Uncanny X-Men #316
X-Men #36
Uncanny X-Men #317
X-Men #37
Life Signs
X-Factor #106
X-Force #38
Excalibur #82
Final Sanction
Wolverine (vol. 2) #85
Cable #16

Collected editions
The comics were collected into the Origin of Generation X trade paperback, published in 1996. A second printing was published on June 1, 2001.

Related issues
 The X-Tinction Agenda: included events which led to the creation of the Phalanx.
 Uncanny X-Men #291:  Steven Lang is recruited from an institution to guide the mutant-hating group who will become the Phalanx.
 Uncanny X-Men #305–306, and 312–313:  The X-Men battle early Phalanx prototypes and face the real deal for the first time.
 Excalibur #78–80: Douglock joins Excalibur.

In other media 
This storyline was re-imagined by Marvel in illustrated novel form on October 17, 1995.
The Phalanx Covenant was adapted into the two-part fifth-season premiere of the X-Men animated series with Beast as the central character.  The Phalanx were conceived to be fully alien and not mutant hating humans who were infected with the technology, becoming more like the Technarchy, with Cameron Hodge working along with them serving much the same role as in the comics.  During the two parter, Beast teams up with Warlock, Forge (part of X-Factor), Mr Sinister, Amelia Voght (who was working on Muir Island at the time) and Magneto.
The Phalanx were also the primary inspiration for the 1995 Sega Genesis video game, X-Men 2: Clone Wars.

Trivia 
 In the Season Two premiere of Boy Meets World, Cory's class is assigned with reading Uncanny X-Men #316 and comparing it to the Odyssey.